Steve, Steven or Stephen Adler may refer to:

 Stephen J. Adler (born 1955), American journalist and editor-in-chief of Reuters
 Stephen L. Adler (born 1939), American physicist
 Steve Adler (politician) (born 1956), mayor of Austin, Texas
 Steven Adler (born 1965), American rock musician, former Guns N' Roses drummer